In mathematics, the Riesz rearrangement inequality, sometimes called Riesz–Sobolev inequality, states that any three non-negative functions ,  and  satisfy the inequality

History 
The inequality was first proved by Frigyes Riesz in 1930, 
and independently reproved by S.L.Sobolev in 1938. Brascamp, Lieb and Luttinger have shown that can be generalized to arbitrarily (but finitely) many functions acting on arbitrarily many variables.

Applications 
The Riesz rearrangement inequality can be used to prove the Pólya–Szegő inequality.

Proofs

One-dimensional case 

Then the inequality can be extended to characteristic functions of measurable sets, to measurable functions taking a finite number of values and finally to nonnegative measurable functions.

Higher-dimensional case

In order to pass from the one-dimensional case to the higher-dimensional case, the spherical rearrangement is approximated by Steiner symmetrization for which the one-dimensional argument applies directly by Fubini's theorem.

Equality cases 
In the case where any one of the three functions is a strictly symmetric-decreasing function, equality holds only when the other two functions are equal, up to translation, to their symmetric-decreasing rearrangements.

References

Inequalities
Rearrangement inequalities
Real analysis